Sandstone Ranch may refer to:
 Sandstone Ranch (Colorado), an historic place in Longmont, Colorado
 Sandstone Ranch (Nevada), an historic place in Clark County, Nevada
 Sandstone Retreat, a former sexually open community  for swingers in California in existence between 1969 and 1976